Alan James Neill (born 10 June 1956) is a Northern Irish cricket umpire. Neill serves as a member of the ICC Associate and Affiliate Panel of Umpires representing Ireland.

Neill stood in matches during the 2016 ICC World Cricket League Division Five tournament in Jersey in May 2016, including the final between Jersey and Oman. On 12 July 2016 he stood in his first One Day International (ODI) match, between Ireland and Afghanistan. On 5 September 2016 he stood in his first Twenty20 International match, between Ireland and Hong Kong.

In April 2019, he was one of four umpires to be awarded a full-time season contract by Cricket Ireland, the first time that Cricket Ireland have offered such contracts to umpires.

See also
 List of One Day International cricket umpires
 List of Twenty20 International cricket umpires

References

External links
 
 

1956 births
Living people
Irish cricket umpires
Irish One Day International cricket umpires
Irish Twenty20 International cricket umpires
People from County Down
People from Downpatrick